Cliff Almond is an American drummer and percussion player.
He has participated in many recordings of a renowned pianist, Michel Camilo, including One More Once (1995) and Thru My Eyes (1997)
.

References

Living people
American drummers
Year of birth missing (living people)
Place of birth missing (living people)